The 1911–12 Cincinnati Bearcats men's basketball team represented the University of Cincinnati during the 1911–12 college men's basketball season. The head coach was Russell Easton, coaching his second season with the Bearcats.

Schedule

|-

References

Cincinnati Bearcats men's basketball seasons
Cincinnati Bearcats men's basketball team
Cincinnati Bearcats men's basketball team
Cincinnati Bearcats men's basketball team